The South East South South Governors Forum is a non-partisan organization consisting of state governors from the geopolitical zones of South East and South South in Nigeria. It was established on 9 July 2017 to pursue interregional cooperation for greater integration and to politically work together towards realigning as a people that shared common heritage, culture and affinity.

Akwa Ibom State Governor, Emmanuel Udom was appointed  chairman of the Forum at the first meeting held at the Nike Lake Resort in Enugu, the capital of Enugu State. The next meeting is expected to take place in Port Harcourt, the Rivers State capital, on 27 August 2017.

List of current governors

References

Organizations established in 2017
State governors of Nigeria
2017 establishments in Nigeria
Political organizations based in Nigeria
Government-related professional associations